North Cascade Heli Skiing (based in Mazama, Washington), is a heliskiing operator permitted by the United States Forest Service to operate in a 300,000 acre area of the Okanogan and Wenatchee National Forests.

References
"Go North Cascade heli-ski" in Men's Fitness by Noah Johnson  November 2006

External links
 North Cascade Heli

Ski areas and resorts in Washington (state)
Buildings and structures in Okanogan County, Washington